Markus Butter (born 1973) is an Austrian operatic baritone.

Career 

Also in 1994 he began to work as an oratorio and lieder singer in Austria and Germany. From 1998 to 1999 he was a member of the Junge Ensemble of the Bavarian State Opera and from 1999 he was a member of the Bavarian State Opera. Afterwards he moved to the Deutsche Oper am Rhein and in 2005 to the Semperoper Dresden.

Guest performances led him to the Aalto-Theater in Essen (2014), to the Bregenzer Festspiele (2014) and several times to the Theater an der Wien (2010, 2011, 2015).

Roles (selection) 
 2014–2015: Dr. Falke (Die Fledermaus), Semperoper
 2014–2015: Der Sprecher (The Magic Flute), Semperoper
 2014–2015: Rittmeister, Beichtvater (Geschichten aus dem Wiener Wald by HK Gruber), Bregenzer Festspiele, Theater an der Wien
 Flandrischer Deputierter (Don Carlo), Bavarian State Opera
 Gerichtsdiener (Was ihr wollt), Bavarian State Opera
 Hauptmann (Simon Boccanegra), Bavarian State Opera
 Kuligin (Katja Kabanowa), Bavarian State Opera
 Moralès (Carmen), Bavarian State Opera
 Masetto (Don Giovanni), Theater an der Wien

Awards 
 1997: 2nd prize at the international competition "Das Schubertlied" in Vienna
 2009: Christel-Goltz-Prize

References

External links 
 Markus Butter on the website of the Semperoper
 Markus Butter on the website of the Bavarian State Opera
 Markus Butter on the website of the Aalto-Theater
 

1973 births
Living people
People from Bruck an der Mur
Austrian operatic baritones
21st-century Austrian  male opera singers